Botryodiplodia oncidii is an ascomycete fungus that is a plant pathogen. It causes dieback on Cattleya.

References

External links 
 Index Fungorum
 USDA ARS Fungal Database

Ascomycota enigmatic taxa
Fungal plant pathogens and diseases
Orchid diseases
Fungi described in 1926